Dasyuris partheniata is a species of moth in the family Geometridae. It is endemic to New Zealand.  It is classified as "At Risk, Declining" by the Department of Conservation.

Taxonomy 
This species was first described by Achille Guenée in 1868 from a specimen collected by Richard William Fereday in Canterbury. George Vernon Hudson discussed and illustrated the species in 1898 and again in 1928. He states that Fereday's specimens were collected at the foot of Mount Hutt. The holotype specimen is held at the Natural History Museum, London.

Description 

The eggs of this species are yellowish-white in appearance, elliptical in shape and have hexagonal depressions on the surface.

Larvae are coloured pale yellow-brown on their dorsal side and a dull ocherous shade on their lateral side. They have 16 legs and are extremely thin.

The pupa is approximately cm long and is initially coloured pale yellow but darkens to golden then dark brown.

Hudson described the adults of the species as follows:

Distribution 
D. partheniata is endemic to New Zealand. This species has occurred at Waiouru, the Tararua Range including at Mount Holdsworth, Wellington, Mount Arthur, Mount Hutt, Arthur's Pass National Park, Homer, Mount Cook, Dunedin, Lake Wakatipu, and at the Hump Ridge. The species can occur from sea level up to approximately 1500m in altitude.

Behaviour
D. partheniata larvae are nocturnal and when their safety is threatened drop to the centre of the plants they are feeding on. The larvae of this species has been observed, in the present of an Ichneumon wasp, gripping the blade of its foodplant with its prolegs and beating it with its body, causing the blade to move from side to side.

The adults of this species are day flying moths and are on the wing during the months of October to March.

Habitat 
The species occurs in open grassy areas. In Wellington the species prefers coastal cliffs and at Mount Hutt specimens have been collected in tussock grass.

Host species 
The host plants of this species are in the genus Aciphylla and include Aciphylla subflabellata.

Conservation status
This moth is classified under the New Zealand Threat Classification system as being At Risk and Declining.

References

External links

Image of larvae

Larentiinae
Moths of New Zealand
Endemic fauna of New Zealand
Endangered biota of New Zealand
Moths described in 1868
Taxa named by Achille Guenée
Endemic moths of New Zealand